B.o.B Presents: The Adventures of Bobby Ray is the debut studio album by American rapper B.o.B, released on April 27, 2010, by Grand Hustle Records, Rebel Rock Entertainment and Atlantic Records. Production for the album took place during 2008 to 2010 and was handled by B.o.B, Crada, Dr. Luke, The Smeezingtons, Jim Jonsin, Lil' C, Alex da Kid, Polow da Don, and DJ Frank E.

The album debuted at number one on the US Billboard 200 chart, selling 84,000 copies in its first week. It attained international charting and spawned three chart-topping singles, including the Billboard hits "Nothin' on You", "Airplanes" and "Magic". Upon its release, B.o.B Presents: The Adventures of Bobby Ray received positive reviews from most music critics.

Release and promotion
In 2008, after signing with Atlantic and Grand Hustle, B.o.B subsequently began working on his debut album. For a long period the album's tentative title was simply The Adventures of Bobby Ray. In October 2009, during his appearance at the BET Hip Hop Awards, B.o.B revealed that fellow American rappers Eminem and Lupe Fiasco would be featured on his debut album.

Atlantic Records unveiled the album's original release date to be May 25, 2010. With already five mixtapes under his belt, B.o.B decided to release a mixtape in promotion for the album, appropriately titled May 25th, to bring awareness to the album's release date. The mixtape, released February 1, 2010, was heavily downloaded and features guest appearances from J. Cole, Asher Roth, Playboy Tre, Charles Hamilton and Bruno Mars, the latter of whom is featured on the mixtape's bonus track, titled "Nothin' on You". The track "Nothin' on You", was then serviced as the lead single from The Adventures of Bobby Ray the very next day. In a rare occurrence in hip hop music, the album's release date was pushed up to April 27, 2010 in response to the success of the mixtape and "Nothin' on You".

The album's track listing was revealed on April 3, 2010. In the US, the album was ultimately released with the bonus tracks "Letters from Vietnam" and "I See Ya".

Singles
The album's first single "Nothin' on You" featuring Bruno Mars, was uploaded onto B.o.B.'s MySpace on November 25, 2009, and released as the lead single on February 2, 2010 and achieved double Platinum sales in the United States. The album's second single "Don't Let Me Fall", peaked at number 67 on the US Billboard Hot 100. "Don't Let Me Fall," was sent to radio on September 28, 2010 in the United States. The album's third single "Airplanes", was released on April 13, 2010. "Airplanes" features Hayley Williams of Paramore and it has charted over 9 countries and peaked at number 2 in the United States and at number 1 in the United Kingdom. The song's sequel titled "Airplanes, Part II", which also was notable for charting and containing a featured verse from American rapper and international superstar Eminem. The album's song "Bet I", was released as a promotional single on April 20, 2010 and features a verse from T.I.. The album's fourth single "Magic", features Weezer's lead singer Rivers Cuomo. The song has charted over 10 countries and became his third top ten hit on the US Billboard Hot 100. After previously being released as a promotional single on October 21, 2008, "I'll Be in the Sky", was released on January 31, 2011, as the album's fifth single in United Kingdom. "I'll Be in the Sky" was only included on the European edition and the Japanese edition bonus tracks of the album.

Critical reception

B.o.B Presents: The Adventures of Bobby Ray received generally positive reviews from most music critics. At Metacritic, which assigns a normalized rating out of 100 to reviews from mainstream critics, the album received an average score of 67, based on 18 reviews, which indicates "generally favorable reviews". AllMusic writer David Jeffries gave it four out of five stars and noted "how effortless [B.O.B] makes all this genre-juggling seem, especially on repeat listens as the album evolves from a high-caliber collection of singles to a unified body of work". The Washington Posts Sarah Godfrey commended its varied sound and wrote that B.o.B "thoughtfully creates tracks to suit the strengths of each guest, with the one constant being his ability to adapt to almost any style". The Independents Andy Gill wrote that "he shares [André 3000]'s fancy for a concept [...] developing a theme about the schizoid confusion between the real Bobby Ray and the fantasy superstar". Mike Diver of BBC Online called him "a musician with creativity on tap and enough of it to burn through a little filler here while ensuring the prime cuts emerge perfectly". XXLs Chris Yuscavage gave the album an XL rating and called it "genre-blending".

In contrast, Kenny Herzog of Spin viewed that the album struggles to "establish a distinctive identity", noting "When 'eclectic' is just another word for 'a mess'". Rolling Stones Jody Rosen viewed B.o.B's lyricism as a weakness, calling his boasts "witless". Giving it a 6.5/10 rating, Jesal Padania of RapReviews called it "a potentially divisive album" and found its lyrical depth inconsistent. The Guardians Paul MacInnes perceived "a distinct lack of passion", stating "all the Chris Martinesque piano lines and calibrated guest appearances... can't obscure an absence of soul throughout". Jayson Greene of Pitchfork Media called it "a dishearteningly generic and hollow product with no soul or demographic or viewpoint", and perceived that the album's production purposely overshadows his rapping, stating "B.o.B is a fantastically gifted rapper, with an astonishing rhythmic command and a tricky, limber way with phrasing. On Bobby Ray he's reduced to a guest rapper on his own songs".

Despite writing that its "middle sags futilely", Slant Magazine's M.T. Richards praised its "vibrant energy" and B.o.B's "burning charisma". Entertainment Weeklys Simon Vozick-Levinson stated "when the combination of styles works, he hits a sweet spot that's sure to advance his crossover career". Los Angeles Times writer Todd Martens wrote favorably of B.o.B's "middle-class tales", stating "at his best, [B.o.B] channels the spirit of a young Kanye West". Nathan Rabin of The A.V. Club complimented his lyrics concerning "relationships, fame, ambition, and identity", stating "B.o.B’s soulful, Southern-fried sensitivity dominates this assured, thoughtful debut". USA Todays Steve Jones praised his "boldly inventive rhymes" and musicianship, stating "He colors outside the hip-hop box both lyrically and sonically, mixing and matching soul, rock, pop, folk, rap and funk with abandon. He shifts moods and varies themes touching on such topics as the cost of fame, staying hopeful and being hopelessly infatuated".

Commercial performance
The album debuted at number one on the US Billboard 200 chart, with first-week sales of 84,000 copies. It also entered at number one on Billboards R&B/Hip-Hop Albums, Digital Albums, and Rap Albums charts. It fell to number 12 in its second week on the Billboard 200, selling 36,000 additional copies. By its second week, it had sold 148,000 copies in the United States. The album sold 23,000 copies at number 13 in its third week on the Billboard 200. It dropped to number 15 with 20,000 copies sold in its fourth week on the chart. It remained at number 13 and sold 20,000 copies in its fifth week on the chart, bringing its total domestic sales to 210,000 copies by June 6, 2010. On December 16, 2010, the album was certified gold for shipments of 500,000 copies in the US. As of April 30, 2012, the album had sold 597,000 copies in the United States.

Internationally, B.o.B Presents: The Adventures of Bobby Ray achieved some chart success. In Canada, the album debuted at number seven on the Top 100 albums chart. It also entered at number 42 on the ARIA Top 50 Albums in Australia, and in New Zealand, it entered at number 23 on the RIANZ Top 40 Albums chart. It peaked at number 21 and spent five weeks on the latter chart. In the United Kingdom, the album debuted at number 22 on the Top 40 Albums and at number four on the R&B Albums Chart.

Track listing

Notes
 signifies a co-producer.
 signifies an additional producer.

Personnel
Credits for B.o.B Presents: The Adventures of Bobby Ray adapted from Allmusic.

 Aaron Bay-Schuck – A&R
 B-Rich – associate producer
 B.o.B – executive producer
 Ryan Brady – marketing
 LaTrice Burnette – marketing
 Corday "Dezedwell" Cardwell – graphics
 Mike Caren – A&R
 John Coster – marketing
 Brian "Busy" Dackowski – marketing
 Anne Declemente – A&R
 Joe Fitz – mixing
 Chris Gehringer – mastering

 Rob Gold – art producer, art manager
 Jim Jonsin – executive producer
 Alex Danger Kirzhner – design
 Sydney Margetson – publicity
 Isam "MrNuDay" Muhammad – graphics
 Shanieke Peru – stylist
 Doug Peterson – associate producer
 Sam Riback – A&R
 Alex Schwartz – A&R
 Pamela Simon – packaging manager
 T.I. – executive producer
 The Smeezingtons - instrumentation

Charts and certifications

Weekly charts

Year-end charts

Certifications

References

External links
 
 B.o.B Presents: The Adventures of Bobby Ray at Discogs
 B.o.B Presents: The Adventures of Bobby Ray at Metacritic

2010 debut albums
B.o.B albums
Atlantic Records albums
Grand Hustle Records albums
Albums produced by DJ Frank E
Albums produced by Dr. Luke
Albums produced by Jim Jonsin
Albums produced by Alex da Kid
Albums produced by Eminem
Albums produced by Honorable C.N.O.T.E.
Albums produced by B.o.B
Albums produced by the Knux
Albums produced by the Smeezingtons
Albums produced by Lex Luger
Albums produced by Lil' C (record producer)